The Drenica (Serbian Cyrillic: Дреница) is a river in Kosovo, a 50 km-long left tributary to the Sitnica river. It flows entirely within Kosovo and gives its name to the surrounding Drenica region.

The Drenica originates from the central section of the Crnoljeva mountain, in Drenica region. The river originally flows to the north and receives many streams coming down from the Crnoljeva (on the left) and Goleš (from the right) mountains. The composite valley of the river is densely populated, with several large villages (Krajmirovce, Sedlare, Rusinovce, Banjica, Komorane, Donja Koretica, Dobroševac) and a small town of Glogovac, one of two regional centers of Drenica region.

At Glogovac, the Drenica receives the Vrbovačka reka from the left and forms a large elbow turn to the north to the southern slopes of the Čičavica mountain. Near the village of Veliki Belaćevac, the Drenica turns to the south but at the village of Velika Slatina makes another elbow turn to the north, splits in two arms and empties into the Sitnica near the town of Kosovo.

The Drenica belongs to the Black Sea drainage basin, drains an area of 447 km2 and it is not navigable.

Notes

References 

 Mala Prosvetina Enciklopedija, Third edition (1985); Prosveta; 
 Jovan Đ. Marković (1990): Enciklopedijski geografski leksikon Jugoslavije; Svjetlost-Sarajevo; 

Rivers of Kosovo
Drenica